Mysticoncha harrisonae is a species of small sea snail that resembles a sea slug, a marine gastropod mollusc in the family Velutinidae. This species is known only from the vicinity of  South Island and Stewart Island in New Zealand.

References

 Powell A. W. B., New Zealand Mollusca, William Collins Publishers Ltd, Auckland, New Zealand 1979 

Velutinidae
Gastropods of New Zealand
Gastropods described in 1946